Asqar Asanūly Beisenbaev (born 31 January 1961) is a Kazakh politician who's serving as Ambassador to Belarus since 12 August 2019. Prior to that, he served as a Deputy Chair of the Senate of Kazakhstan from 2013 to 2019, and member of the Mazhilis from 2001 to 2008.

Biography

Early life and education 
Beisenbaev was born in 1961 in the Tulkibas District of South Kazakhstan Region. In 1983, he graduated from the Almaty branch of the Dzhambul Technological Institute of Light and Food Industry with a degree in processing engineering and in 2004, from the Kazakh-Russian University with a degree in law.

Early career 
In 1983, Beisenbaev became a shift engineer-technologist at the Tulkubas Cannery. From 1984, he was the chief technologist, and the head of the Cannery at the Lenin Joly State Farm before becoming the Second Secretary of the Sairam District Committee of the Komsomol in February 1988. From November 1988 to September 1992, he was the Chief Engineer and Director of the Tulkubas Cannery until he became the Director of the Tulkubasskiy Combine of Grain Products. Beisenbaev served as the Director until he became the President of Kokterek JSC in 1994.

Political career 
In 1998, he was appointed as the Äkim of Tulkibas District. He served the post until becoming the member of the Mazhilis in 2001. After being reelected in 2004 from the 59th constituency of South Kazakhstan Region as Auyl party member, Beisenbaev served as a member of the Committee on Agrarian Issues of the Mazhilis, member of the parliament group on Otbasy Population and Development until 5 May 2008. 

From 29 April to August 2008, Beisenbaev was the Head of the Representative Office of the President in the Parliament. 

On 26 August 2013, he was appointed as a member of the Senate of Kazakhstan where he was elected its Deputy Chair on 3 September 2013. Beisenbaev served as the Deputy Chair until he was replaced by Bektas Beknazarov on 16 September 2016. From 2017, Beisenbaev was the Chairman of the Committee on Economic Policy, Innovative Development and Entrepreneurship of the Senate. 

On 12 August 2019, he was relieved from his post as a Senator and was appointed as a Kazakh Ambassador to Belarus.

References 

1961 births
People from Turkistan Region
Nur Otan politicians
Members of the Mazhilis
Members of the Senate of Kazakhstan
Living people